The Indonesian Cycling Federation or ISSI (in Indonesian: Ikatan Sepeda Sport Indonesia) is the national governing body of cycle racing in Indonesia.

The ISSI is a member of the UCI and the ACC.

External links
 Indonesian Cycling Federation official website

Cycle racing organizations
Cycling
Cycle racing in Indonesia
National members of the Asian Cycling Confederation